The Columbia Mill is a former grist mill on Cedar Creek in Cedarburg Wisconsin, in the United States. The mill was built in 1843 by Dr. Frederick A. Luening.

History

Early operation
The Columbia Mill was the first mill to be built on Cedar Creek, and several others would be built in the following years, forming the local area's early industrial economy. While the mill was initially successful, overall it had a troubled history. The mill was sold nine times before 1900; notably it was owned by Joseph Trottman from 1853 to 1864, who would later have an interest in the Hilgen and Wittenberg Woolen Mill, which was located upstream. It was also partially owned by Ernst Hilgen, the nephew of Cedarburg Founder Frederick Hilgen, from 1864 to 1874.

The mill also suffered from flooding issues. Soon after completion, settlers upstream complained about flooding on Cedar Creek, and the dam was torn down and rebuilt further downstream. In addition, in 1881 the mill's dam washed out during heavy spring flooding and was rebuilt some time later; it was also rebuilt again in 1914.

20th century
In 1910 the mill had a capacity of 100 barrels per day. In 1926 the mill was bought by the Wire and Nail Company, whose mill is located just downstream, for use of the mill's hydropower. In 1939 the Highland Avenue Bridge above the mill's dam and millrace was rebuilt as a PWA project for the City of Cedarburg.

From the 1960s through the 1970s, a sewer carried waste oil including PCBs from Mercury Marine's Cedarburg factory to the Ruck Pond above the Columbia Mill Pond. The contamination was also carried downstream to the Columbia Mill Pond where it settled into the sediment of the millpond.

Decline
Through the 1970s, the mill fell into disuse and disrepair and was demolished in the 1970s and a bank was built in its place, with the dam and millrace remaining. In 2017, PCB-contaminated sediment was dredged from the millpond in a large scale effort to clean up Cedar Creek. In 2019 the City of Cedarburg completed significant repairs to the remaining dam and millrace to increase the dam's capacity.

See also

References

Further reading 
 
 

Grinding mills in Wisconsin
Industrial buildings and structures in Wisconsin
Dams in Wisconsin
Industrial buildings completed in 1843
1843 establishments in Wisconsin Territory